Mina Celentano is a duet album by Italy's chart-topping artists Mina and Adriano Celentano, issued in 1998. Lucio Battisti was initially attached to the project but he eventually dropped out.

The album was recorded in Galbiate and Lugano and was produced by Massimiliano Pani.

Mina Celentano became one of the best-selling albums in Italy, with over 2 million copies sold.

The album spawned two singles, Acqua e sale and Brivido felino. Mina would later record Spanish versions of both songs with different male singers, respectively Miguel Bosé and Diego Torres).

Track listing

Credits
Adriano Celentano – vocals
Mina – vocals
Alfredo Golino – drums
Maurizio Dei Lazzaretti – drums
Paolo Gianolio – guitar
Massimo Varini – guitar
Giorgio Cocilovo – guitar
Umberto Fiorentino – guitar
Danilo Rea – piano, accordion
Nicolò Fragile – keyboards
Massimo Moriconi – bass
Massimiliano Pani – keyboards

Trivia
A special edition of the album, titled Mina Celentano – Buon Natale, was released during the Christmas season packaged with a CD-ROM titled "Molly e destino solitario" featuring an animated video of Che t'aggia di.

18 years later, in 2016, Mina and Celentano recorded a second collaborative album called Le Migliori ("the best ones", in reference to a quote by Celentano describing their collaboration).

Certifications and sales

See also
List of best-selling albums in Italy

References

1998 albums
Mina (Italian singer) albums
Pop-folk albums
Adriano Celentano albums